Boulevard Historic District may refer to:

 Boulevard Historic District (Athens, Georgia), listed on the NRHP in Georgia
 Boulevard Subdivision Historic District, Greenwood, MS, listed on the NRHP in Mississippi
 Boulevards Historic District, Lincoln, NE, listed on the NRHP in Nebraska
 Boulevard Oaks Historic District, Houston, TX, listed on the NRHP in Texas
 Boulevard Historic District (Richmond, Virginia), listed on the NRHP in Virginia